Cain and His Race Cursed By God (French:) is an 1833-1839 marble sculpture by Antoine Étex, produced after an initial version in plaster which was made in Rome between 1831 and 1832, now in the Saint-Louis Chapel at the Pitié-Salpêtrière Hospital. It was inspired by Cain's murder of Abel. It was firsts exhibited as a plaster version at the Paris Salon of 1833, where it proved very successful and put him at the forefront of the 1830s generation of Romantic sculptors. The marble version was finished in 1839 and is now in the Museum of Fine Arts of Lyon.

Sources
https://www.mba-lyon.fr/fr/fiche-oeuvre/cain-et-sa-race-maudits-de-dieu

Cultural depictions of Cain and Abel
1830s sculptures
Marble sculptures
Sculptures of the Museum of Fine Arts of Lyon
Sculptures of children